General Julio Ronald Salazar Monroe was the de jure chief of Peru's National Intelligence Service (SIN) during the early 1990s. During Salazar's tenure at the SIN, Vladimiro Montesinos acted as the de facto chief of the SIN and the National Security Advisor.

On April 8, 2008, Salazar was sentenced to 35 years of prison for his role in the La Cantuta Massacre, which was carried out by the Grupo Colina death squad.

Notes 

Year of birth missing (living people)
Living people
Defense ministers of Peru
Peruvian generals
Peruvian criminals
Peruvian prisoners and detainees
Prisoners and detainees of Peru